The 2004 Copa del Rey Juvenil was the 54th staging of the Copa del Rey Juvenil tournament. The competition began on May 16, 2004 and ended on June 26, 2004 with the final.

First round

|}

Quarterfinals

|}

Semifinals

|}

Final

References

Copa del Rey Juvenil de Fútbol
Juvenil